Damien Hétu (October 24, 1926 – February 15, 2010) was a Canadian politician. Hétu served as mayor of Sainte-Agathe-des-Monts, Quebec on two separate occasions and was a Liberal member of the National Assembly of Quebec from 1985 to 1989.

Early life and career

Hétu was born in Sainte-Agathe-des-Monts and received his early education in the town. He trained as an electrician and radio/television technician, and in 1952 he began working as an electrician and entrepreneur in his home community. He successfully campaigned for a local sports center, which was opened in the 1970s.

Hétu was a municipal councillor in Sainte-Agathe-des-Monts from 1959 to 1965 and was the community's mayor from 1970 to 1974. In the same period, he was an organizer for both the Liberal Party of Canada and the Quebec Liberal Party. He ran for the Quebec legislature in the 1981 provincial election and lost to incumbent Parti Québécois cabinet minister Jacques Léonard in Labelle.

Legislator

Hétu was elected to the national assembly on his second attempt in the 1985 provincial election. The Liberal Party won a majority government in this election under Robert Bourassa's leadership, and Hétu served for the next four years as a government backbencher. A 1988 newspaper report indicates that he had one of the best attendance records in the legislature, missing fewer than one per cent of recorded votes.

He was defeated by Léonard a second time when seeking re-election in 1989.

Return to municipal politics

Hétu was re-elected as mayor of Sainte-Agathe-des-Monts in 1990 and served until 1994. He presided over a water boil advisory for the community in 1992, due to concerns about contamination from lead pipes.

Death

Hétu died in February 2010, after an extended illness.

Electoral record

References

1926 births
2010 deaths
People from Sainte-Agathe-des-Monts
Quebec Liberal Party MNAs